Earth Dances is an orchestral work by British composer Harrison Birtwistle. Its title is part of a geological metaphor that is also found in the piece's structure: Birtwistle has divided the orchestra into six 'strata', whose changing relationships reflect those of the earth's geological layers. It was composed in 1986 for the BBC Symphony Orchestra.

References

Compositions by Harrison Birtwistle
1986 compositions
Compositions for symphony orchestra
Music commissioned by the BBC